Željko Tomić (born 21 December 1985 in Rijeka) is Croatian footballer who currently plays for NK Vinodol.

Honours 
Skënderbeu Korçë
 Albanian Superliga 2012-13 
 Albanian Superliga 2013-14
 Albanian Supercup 2013

References

External links

2. https://www.sportcom.hr/lokalni-sport/nogomet/koper-rusi-rekorde-momcad-damira-milinovica-u-15-kolu-cetvrte-lige-pobijedila-rezultatom-24-0

1985 births
Living people
Footballers from Rijeka
Association football midfielders
Croatian footballers
HNK Orijent players
NK Pomorac 1921 players
NK Primorje players
NK Krk players
HNK Rijeka players
KF Skënderbeu Korçë players
NK Vinogradar players
NK Nehaj players
FC Koper players
Croatian Football League players
Slovenian PrvaLiga players
Kategoria Superiore players
Slovenian Second League players
Croatian expatriate footballers
Croatian expatriate sportspeople in Slovenia
Croatian expatriate sportspeople in Albania
Expatriate footballers in Slovenia
Expatriate footballers in Albania